The Abbey of Santo Spirito d'Ocre (Italian: Monastero di Santo Spirito d'Ocre) was a Cistercian monastery located in Ocre, Province of L'Aquila, Italy.

History
The fortified monastery was built in 1226 on an ancient religious building, existing since 1222. In 1248 Santo Spirito became a Cistercian abbey, founded by the mother abbey of Casanova, line of Clairvaux, and it was ruled by the Cistercians until 1692.

Architecture
The monastery is a fortified building, with walls all around the abbey and a very small number of windows and doors.

Inside the walls, all the usual components of a monastery are still in place, with the church on the north side and the remaining rooms of the abbey in the two buildings on the west and east sides.

See also
 List of Cistercian monasteries

References

Bibliography

External links

Santo Spirito d'Ocre
Buildings and structures in the Province of L'Aquila